Miguel Ângelo Leonardo Vítor (born 30 June 1989) is a professional footballer who plays as a centre-back for Israeli club Hapoel Be'er Sheva, where he is also captain, and for the Israel national team.

He spent most of his career with Benfica (mostly as backup), PAOK and Hapoel Be'er Sheva.

Born in Portugal, Vítor represented Portugal at youth level before switching his allegiance to Israel in 2022.

Club career

Benfica
Vítor was born in Torres Vedras, Lisbon District. Having been promoted from S.L. Benfica's junior squad for the 2007–08 season, he made his debut for the first team in August 2007, appearing in both the Primeira Liga, against Vitória de Guimarães, and the UEFA Champions League, facing F.C. Copenhagen in the third qualifying round; this was because habitual starters Luisão and David Luiz were sidelined with injuries.

Like Romeu Ribeiro, Vítor was loaned to Liga de Honra side C.D. Aves in January 2008 until the end of the season. Subsequently, he returned to Benfica, being relatively used in his first full campaign.

In early July 2010, Vítor joined English Championship club Leicester City in a season-long loan, teaming up with compatriots Moreno and manager Paulo Sousa. He made his debut on 21 September in a 2–1 win over Portsmouth in the third round of the League Cup at Fratton Park. On 6 November he scored his first professional goal, heading from a Martyn Waghorn free kick after 18 minutes in an eventual 2–0 victory against Barnsley at Oakwell.

On 19 December 2010, Vítor suffered a pulled hamstring in a 3–0 away defeat to Ipswich Town, being sidelined for three months. He netted twice on his return, a 3–0 win at Scunthorpe United on 12 March 2011.

Vítor subsequently returned to Benfica, being completely ostracised by manager Jorge Jesus – as practically all Portuguese players – and even being demoted to the B team. After he refused to renew his contract, he left in late May 2013.

PAOK
On 24 June 2013, Vítor signed with Super League Greece club PAOK FC. He scored his first goal for his new team – also their first in the new season – on 17 August, netting through a header in a 3–0 home win against Skoda Xanthi FC.

Vítor was first choice during his spell in Thessaloniki, scoring twice in 33 games in the 2014–15 campaign to help his side finish third. On 10 June 2016, it was announced he would be released as his contract would not be renewed.

Hapoel Be'er Sheva
On 1 July 2016, free agent Vítor agreed to a three-year deal at Israeli Premier League champions Hapoel Be'er Sheva FC, for an undisclosed fee. He won the national championship in his first two seasons, totalling three goals in the process.

Vítor extended his contract in November 2017, to last until 2021. He became captain, and accompanied by compatriots David Simão and Josué Pesqueira, won the State Cup on 13 July 2020 with a 2–0 final victory over Hapoel Petah Tikva FC.

In February 2022, Vítor's link to his club was extended by another year, to June 2023.

International career

Portugal
Vítor earned 33 caps for Portugal at youth levels, starting with a 2–1 win for the under-18s against Ukraine in Montemor-o-Novo on 30 November 2006; he scored the opening goal. His final appearance was his sole game for the under-23 team on 23 March 2011, a 3–2 victory over an Italian Lega Pro XI in Trapani.

Israel
In October 2021, Vítor declared his wish to naturalise himself as an Israeli citizen and to play for the national team, a decision supported by Austrian manager Willibald Ruttensteiner. Israel Football Association chairman Oren Hasson sent the player's official application to the government – the Minister of Culture and Sport Hili Tropper recommended it to the Minister of Interior Ayelet Shaked, who granted Vítor's application to become a citizen on 1 May 2022.

Vítor's naturalisation was criticised by some in Israel as motivated only by his footballing ability. His case was contrasted with that of African-American Jewish basketball player Jared Armstrong, who was refused citizenship despite his religion and was only given a temporary residency permit.

Vítor made his debut on 2 June 2022 at the age of 32 years and 11 months, starting in a 2–2 home draw against Iceland in the UEFA Nations League.

Personal life
Vítor resided in Israel since 2016, having moved to the country along with his wife and three daughters.

Career statistics

Club

Honours
Benfica
Primeira Liga: 2009–10
Taça da Liga: 2008–09, 2011–12

PAOK
Greek Football Cup runner-up: 2013–14

Hapoel Be'er Sheva
Israeli Premier League: 2016–17, 2017–18
Israel State Cup: 2019–20, 2021–22 
Toto Cup: 2016–17
Israel Super Cup: 2017

Individual
Primeira Liga Young Player of the Month: September 2008
UEFA Europa League Team of the Week:  2016–17
Israeli Footballer of the Year: 2017

See also
List of Israelis

References

External links

1989 births
Living people
People from Torres Vedras
Israeli people of Portuguese descent
Portuguese emigrants to Israel
Naturalized citizens of Israel
Sportspeople from Lisbon District
Portuguese footballers
Israeli footballers
Association football defenders
Primeira Liga players
Liga Portugal 2 players
S.L. Benfica footballers
C.D. Aves players
S.L. Benfica B players
English Football League players
Leicester City F.C. players
Super League Greece players
PAOK FC players
Israeli Premier League players
Hapoel Be'er Sheva F.C. players
Portugal youth international footballers
Portugal under-21 international footballers
Israel international footballers
Portuguese expatriate footballers
Expatriate footballers in England
Expatriate footballers in Greece
Expatriate footballers in Israel
Portuguese expatriate sportspeople in England
Portuguese expatriate sportspeople in Greece
Portuguese expatriate sportspeople in Israel
Israeli Footballer of the Year recipients